Lakeview is a census-designated place (CDP) in Catoosa and Walker counties in the U.S. state of Georgia. The population was 4,820 at the 2000 census and 4,777 at the 2020 census. It is part of the Chattanooga, TN–GA Metropolitan Statistical Area.

History
Lakeview had its start in the year 1925 as a planned community on Lake Winnepesaukah.  The Lake Winnie amusement park is presently within its boundaries.

Geography

Lakeview is located at 34°58'42" North, 85°15'26" West (34.978472, -85.257346).

Demographics

2020 census

As of the 2020 United States census, there were 4,777 people, 1,821 households, and 1,318 families residing in the CDP.

2000 census
As of the census of 2000, there were 4,820 people, 1,996 households, and 1,413 families residing in the CDP. The racial makeup of the CDP was 96.93% White, 0.62% African American, 0.50% Native American, 0.77% Asian, 0.04% Pacific Islander, 0.17% from other races, and 0.98% from two or more races. Hispanic or Latino of any race were 0.91% of the population.

There were 1,996 households, out of which 27.9% had children under the age of 18 living with them, 54.4% were married couples living together, 11.7% had a female householder with no husband present, and 29.2% were non-families. 25.2% of all households were made up of individuals, and 12.0% had someone living alone who was 65 years of age or older.  The average household size was 2.41 and the average family size was 2.88.

In the CDP, the population was spread out, with 22.4% under the age of 18, 7.7% from 18 to 24, 27.1% from 25 to 44, 25.0% from 45 to 64, and 17.8% who were 65 years of age or older.  The median age was 40 years. For every 100 females, there were 90.4 males.  For every 100 females age 18 and over, there were 85.2 males.

The median income for a household in the CDP was $34,817, and the median income for a family was $43,024. Males had a median income of $31,286 versus $22,018 for females. The per capita income for the CDP was $16,873.  About 6.5% of families and 9.7% of the population were below the poverty line, including 13.5% of those under age 18 and 10.6% of those age 65 or over.

References

Census-designated places in Catoosa County, Georgia
Census-designated places in Walker County, Georgia
Chattanooga metropolitan area